Shazia Abdul Hassan (born 10 November 1980) is a Pakistani former cricketer who played as a bowler. She appeared in one Test match and four One Day Internationals for Pakistan in 1997 and 1998.

References

External links
 
 

1980 births
Living people
Cricketers from Lahore
Pakistan women Test cricketers
Pakistan women One Day International cricketers